Balot is a commune in the Côte-d'Or department in Bourgogne-Franche-Comté in eastern France.

The inhabitants of the commune are known as Baielois or Baieloises.

Geography
Balot is located some 10 km south-west of Châtillon-sur-Seine and 25 km north-east of Montbard. Access to the commune is by the D21 road from Laignes in the north-west which passes through the southern part of the commune and the village and continues south-east to Coulmier-le-Sec. The D118 goes north from the village to join the D965 south-east of Marcenay. The D118J goes north-east from the village to Cérilly. There is some forest in the north-east of the commune but it is mostly farmland.

Neighbouring communes and villages

Heraldry

Administration

List of Successive Mayors

Demography
In 2017 the commune had 90 inhabitants.

Culture and heritage

Civil heritage
The commune has a number of buildings and sites that are registered as historical monuments:
A House at Rue du Chateau (1837)
A Sugar Refinery at Rue du Chateau (1834)
A Farmhouse at Rue d'en Haut (19th century)
A House at Rue d'en Haut (18th century)
The Town Hall / School at Rue d'en Haut (19th century)
Houses and Farms

Religious heritage
The commune has several religious buildings and structures that are registered as historical monuments:
A Wayside Cross at CR10/CR4 (1823)
A Wayside Cross at CVO1/CR16 (1938)
A Wayside Cross at D118/CR6 (1804)
A Wayside Cross at D21/CR53 (19th century)
A Cemetery Cross (1672)
A Monumental Cross (17th century)
A Presbytery (1825)
The Parish Church of Saint Pierre-es-Liens (1865)

The Parish Church contains many items that are registered as historical objects:

A Statuette: Virgin and child (18th century)
A Monumental Painting: A Saint bishop and Saint Barbe (16th century)
A Monumental Painting: 5 Saints including Saint Margaret (16th century)
A Consecration Cross (16th century)
The Sennevoy Family Book (17th century)
2 Chasubles (19th century)
2 Processional Staves (18th century)
2 Collection Vases (19th century)
A Candlestick (19th century)
An Altar Cross (18th century)
A Painting: Presentation of Jesus at the Temple (18th century)
A Painting: Saint Irénée (19th century)
A Bas-relief: Assumption (18th century)
A Statue: Saint Nicolas (18th century)
A Group Sculpture: Education of the Virgin (17th century)
A Statue: Saint Catherine (1861)
2 Statues: Saints Paul and John (19th century)
The Chapel Enclosure (19th century)
A Pulpit (19th century)
2 Altars, 2 Tabernacles, and 2 Retables (19th century)
A Tabernacle (17th century)
The main Altar (18th century)
Wood Panelling (19th century)
A Mural Painting, Half-relief, and Statue in the Choir (19th century)
The Furniture in the Church

See also
Communes of the Côte-d'Or department

References

External links
Balot on Géoportail, National Geographic Institute (IGN) website 
Ballot on the 1750 Cassini Map

Communes of Côte-d'Or